Wallace "Wally" Young MHA, is a Canadian politician in Newfoundland and Labrador, Canada. He represented the district of St. Barbe in the Newfoundland and Labrador House of Assembly as a member of the Progressive Conservative Party from 2001 until 2011. Young was elected in a 2001 by-election and re-elected in the 2003 and 2007 provincial elections. Young was defeated in the 2011 provincial election by former Liberal leader Jim Bennett.

Young served as the Parliamentary Secretary to the Minister of Innovation, Trade and Rural Development from November 27, 2009 until September 19, 2011.

Electoral history

|-

|Liberal
|Jim Bennett
|align="right"|1816
|align="right"|45.05%
|align="right"|
|-

|-

|NDP
|Diane Ryan
|align="right"|437
|align="right"|10.84%
|align="right"|
|}

|-

|-

|Liberal
|Jim Bennett
|align="right"|1560
|align="right"|36.73%
|align="right"|
|-

|NDP
|B. Gary Noel
|align="right"|196
|align="right"|4.62%
|align="right"|
|}

|-

|-

|Liberal
|Ralph Payne
|align="right"|1577
|align="right"|32.73%
|align="right"|
|-

|NDP
|Holly Patey
|align="right"|293
|align="right"|6.08%
|align="right"|
|}

References

Progressive Conservative Party of Newfoundland and Labrador MHAs
Year of birth missing (living people)
Living people
21st-century Canadian politicians